Khadidja Touré (born 1959) is a Chadian advocate for human rights. She served as vice president of the CST Human Rights Commission.

References

1959 births
Living people
Chadian human rights activists